The Curia of Pompey, sometimes referred to as the Curia Pompeia, was one of several named meeting halls from Republican Rome of historic significance. A curia was a designated structure for meetings of the senate. The Curia of Pompey was located at the entrance to the Theater of Pompey. While the main senate house was being moved from the Curia Cornelia to a new Curia Julia, the senate would meet in this smaller building, which is best known as the place that members of the Roman Senate murdered Gaius Julius Caesar.

The Curia was attached to the porticus directly behind the theatre section and was a Roman exedra, with a curved back wall and several levels of seating. In A New Topographical Dictionary of Ancient Rome by L. Richardson, Jr., Richardson states that after Caesar's murder, Augustus Caesar removed the large statue of Pompey and had the hall walled up. Richardson cited Suetonius that it was later made into a latrine, as stated by Cassius Dio.

History
In 55 BCE, Gnaeus Pompeius Magnus (Pompey the Great) dedicated the opening of the largest theater in the ancient world before its full completion. Built from the profits of his war campaigns, the structure was a political statement meant to raise the status of the Roman general and consul, as well as to memorialize his achievements throughout his career. That would be copied later by the Roman emperors when they created their own imperial forums.

The full structure consisted of a large theater section, incorporating a temple, a pulpitum or stage, scaenae frons and cavea (seating) at one end, a large quadriporticus that surrounded an extensive garden and housed Pompey's collection of art and literature, and the curia itself at the opposite end from the theater. While the theater complex overall would stand for centuries, the curia itself would last for only about a decade. In 44 BCE, 11 years after the structure opened, Caesar was murdered by a conspiracy of senators. Afterwards, the structure was closed and walled up and was said to have been set on fire. A latrine was put in its place some years later.

Archaeology
The structure is located in an area now called Largo di Torre Argentina. The site was excavated by order of the dictator Benito Mussolini in the 1930s. For the most part, only the foundations of the original structure have been excavated and a modern roadway and rail system are now raised above the remains of the curia. In 2012, it was announced that further excavations had uncovered the precise spot of Caesar's murder, marked by his adopted son within the building before its destruction. It was also later announced that the underground excavations of the curia would be opened to the public in 2013.

References 

Pompey
Buildings and structures completed in the 1st century BC
Assassination of Julius Caesar
Pompey
Rome R. VI Parione
Roman Senate
Assassination sites